Tokyo Diner is a three-floor Japanese restaurant on the corner of Newport Place and Lisle Street in Chinatown, London. The restaurant opened to the public in December 1992.

History 
In 1987, Richard Hills began taking Japanese evening classes, where he became interested in Japanese culture, considering it fascinating and beguiling. Two years later, he went to Japan to learn more about its culture.

When he returned to London, having known the delights of cheap, cheerful eateries in Japan, he transformed the vacant launderette below his own flat into Tokyo Diner and opened in December 1992. As the proprietor, he stated, "it seems that my conviction proved right, because we went into profit within the first month of trading and, despite numerous competitors opening (and closing), we have never been short of customers."

Policies 
Tokyo Diner has the policy of using sustainable sources for its service ever since its opening in 1992. According to the staff members of Tokyo Diner, to extend awareness of the need to reduce the consumption of tuna, the restaurant will not serve tuna-based food.

Another policy is the non-acceptance of tips. According to the menu, any money left on tables (regardless of the intention of the owners) will go to St. Martin-in-the-Fields’ charity for the homeless.

See also 
 List of Japanese restaurants
 List of restaurants in London

Notes and references

Notes

References

External links 

1992 establishments in England
Japanese restaurants in London
Restaurants established in 1990
Restaurants established in 1992